Sunnyville is a 2010 Philippine television informative children's show broadcast by GMA Network. Hosted by Love Añover, Patricia Gayod and Jermaine Ulgasan, it premiered on April 10, 2010. The show concluded on November 13, 2010 with a total of 32 episodes.

Premise
In Sunnyville, the new home that awaits playful 5-year-old Buboy and his elder sister Anna.

Buboy, Anna and their Tita Auring are excited about their new home at Sunnyville. They get a warm welcome from the neighbors from the tenement, and they meet new friends, too. But the sunniest and happiest surprises await them: the resident repairwoman and everyone's big sister Ate Belle and the Bahay Butingting are also in Sunnyville.

Completing the picture is their pet and friend, Ming Ming, whom Anna and Buboy immediately look for in Ate Belle's stockroom. And instead of finding their furry friend, the stockroom takes them to a new and mysterious world where giant plants and flowers abound.

Hosts
 Love Añover as Ate Belle
 Patricia Gayod as Anna
 Jermaine Ulgasan as Buboy
 Joy Viado as Tita Auring

Extended cast
 Maey Bautista
 Betong Sumaya

Ratings
According to AGB Nielsen Philippines' Mega Manila People/Individual television ratings, the final episode of Sunnyville scored a 1.5% rating.

References

2010 Philippine television series debuts
2010 Philippine television series endings
Filipino-language television shows
GMA Network original programming
GMA Integrated News and Public Affairs shows
Philippine children's television series